Frank Gust (born May 24, 1969) is a German serial killer. He has been dubbed The Rhein-Ruhr Ripper by the media because his actions, mainly committed in the Rhine-Ruhr region in western Germany, share similarities with London's Jack the Ripper murders.

Gust is classified as a sexual sadist. At a very young age, he showed a tendency to abuse animals, experiencing sexual arousal when torturing, killing, and gutting animals. At age 13 he began breaking into morgues to act on his necrophiliac inclinations. After he was arrested, Gust stated that his greatest desire was to touch the beating heart of a dying woman.

Between 1994 and 1998 Gust killed four women. His first victim was a 28-year-old hitchhiker from South Africa who lived in the Netherlands and was on a European trip. Her decapitated body was found in a forest area near Ede. In 1996 and 1998 Gust killed two prostitutes, whom he had picked up from Essen central station. His presumed last victim was a 47-year-old aunt of his wife. Gust placed the mutilated bodies of his victims in such a way that they could be discovered soon after the murder. However, the body of his aunt-in-law has never been found.

In 1999 Gust indicated to his mother that he had committed a murder. She told a friend of hers, who informed the police, and Gust was arrested shortly afterwards. On September 21, 2000 he was sentenced to life imprisonment for killing the four women. Gust started a therapy which he quit after only six months, proclaiming that he wasn't treatable and would always remain a threat to other people.

See also
List of German serial killers

References

External links
spiegel.de
faz.net

1969 births
20th-century German criminals
Criminals from North Rhine-Westphalia
German people convicted of murder
German prisoners sentenced to life imprisonment
German serial killers
Living people
Male serial killers
Necrophiles
People convicted of murder by Germany
People from Oberhausen
People with sexual sadism disorder
Prisoners sentenced to life imprisonment by Germany
Zoophilia